Eshraque Mughal, better known by his stage name iSHi, is a Swedish music producer and songwriter.

Life and career
In 2001 iSHi produced the music for The Lick TV show on MTV UK together with One Dread. He started working and spending more in the UK. In 2006, iSHi started working with a whole new project from scratch with rapper Lazee. Two years later, after releasing several singles and the album Setting Standards, iSHi and Lazee decided to go separate ways on good terms. After the summer 2009 he discovered singer Eric Turner. They started working together and later on iSHi signed him to his label 2Stripes Music. Later that year iSHi met British rapper Tinie Tempah. Tinie had just started working on his debut album Disc-Overy and flew over to Sweden to work with iSHi. The first song they did together was "Written in the Stars" featuring Eric Turner. The song became a worldwide hit and sold platinum in several countries including the United States. iSHi has also produced Tinie Tempah's 2013 single "Children Of The Sun" featuring John Martin and the Demonstration album track "Someday (Place in the Sun)".

iSHi has worked with artist such as Usher, Ne-Yo, Shakira, Lupe Fiasco, John Martin, Cheryl Cole, Avicii, Sebastian Ingrosso, Alexandra Burke, Emeli Sandé, Ella Eyre, Professor Green, Tinie Tempah and Wretch 32 among others.

Production credits

Singles 
We Run (feat. French Montana, Wale & Raekwon)

References

1. Anders Nunstedt. "iSHi" berättar att han kände direkt att "Written in the stars" var en "smash" när den spelades in i Stockholm i januari i år.", Expressen, Stockholm, 10 October 2010. Retrieved on 10 October 2010.

2. Bouwman, Kimbel. "iSHi talks to HitQuarters about the influence of Sweden’s hitmaking legends, his UK and US breakthrough with Tinie Tempah", Hitquarters, Retrieved on 12 December 2011.

External links 
 2Stripes Music Official Website
 2Stripes Music Facebook Page

1981 births
Living people
Swedish record producers
Swedish songwriters